Brian Stacy Miller (born January 24, 1967) is a United States district judge of the United States District Court for the Eastern District of Arkansas.

Biography

Early life and education 
Born in Pine Bluff Arkansas, Miller grew up in Helena, Arkansas. Upon graduating from Helena-West Helena Central High School in 1985, he entered active duty in the United States Navy in June 1985 and served as a Boatswains Mate on the USS New Jersey from 1986 to 1989. He served in the United States Navy Reserve in 1984 and from 1989 to 1992.

After being honorably discharged from active duty, he attended Phillips County Community College of the University of Arkansas in Helena and received an Associate of Arts degree in 1991. He received a Bachelor of Science degree, with honors, from the University of Central Arkansas in 1992 and a Juris Doctor from Vanderbilt Law School in 1995.

Career 
He joined the Memphis, Tennessee, law firm of Martin, Tate, Morrow & Marston, P.C. in 1995 and opened the Miller Law Firm in Helena in 1998. He was elected city attorney for his hometown of Helena in 1998 and served in that position from 1999 to 2006. He also served as city attorney for the towns of Lakeview, Arkansas and Edmondson, Arkansas and as city judge for Holly Grove, Arkansas. He served as deputy prosecuting attorney of Phillips County, Arkansas from 2000 to 2006.

In 2007, Miller was appointed to the Arkansas Court of Appeals by Governor Mike Huckabee and served until 2008, when he was appointed to the United States District Court.

Federal judicial service

On October 16, 2007, Miller was nominated by President George W. Bush to a seat on the United States District Court for the Eastern District of Arkansas vacated by George Howard Jr. Miller was confirmed by the United States Senate on April 10, 2008, and received his commission on April 17, 2008. He served as Chief Judge from July 23, 2012, to July 23, 2019.

Personal life 
Miller is married with children and is Catholic.

See also 
 List of African-American federal judges
 List of African-American jurists

Sources

1967 births
Living people
African-American judges
Arkansas state court judges
Judges of the United States District Court for the Eastern District of Arkansas
People from Helena, Arkansas
People from Pine Bluff, Arkansas
United States district court judges appointed by George W. Bush
21st-century American judges
United States Navy sailors
United States Navy reservists
University of Arkansas alumni
University of Central Arkansas alumni
Vanderbilt University Law School alumni
African-American Catholics